Wait or WAIT may refer to:

Music 
 Wait (musician), British town pipers

Albums and EPs
 Wait (The Polyphonic Spree EP), by The Polyphonic Spree
 Wait (Emanuel Nice EP), a 2002 EP released by the band Emanuel Nice
 Wait (Steelheart album), or the title song
 Wait (Sons of Korah album), 2011
 Wait (Pardon Us album), 2019

Songs
 "Wait" (Beatles song), 1965
 "Wait" (Chantel Jeffries song), 2018
 "Wait" (Earshot song), 2004
 "Wait" (Huffamoose song), 1997
 "Wait" (Gyan song), 1989
 "Wait" (M83 song), 2012
 "Wait" (Maggie Reilly song), 1992
 "Wait" (Maroon 5 song), 2018
 "Wait" (Seven Mary  song), 2001
 "Wait" (Wang Chung song), 1984
 "Wait" (White Lion song), 1987
 "Wait (The Whisper Song)", by Ying Yang Twins, 2005 
 "Wait", by 6ix9ine from TattleTales, 2020
 "Wait", by The Afters from I Wish We All Could Win, 2005
 "Wait", by C418 from Minecraft – Volume Beta, 2013
 "Wait", by Chris Brown from Graffiti, 2009
 "Wait", by Danny Chan, 1985
 "Wait", by David Archuleta from The Other Side of Down, 2010
 "Wait", by DIIV from Oshin, 2012
 "Wait", by Earth, Wind & Fire from I Am, 1979
 "Wait", by Everyday Sunday from Sleeper, 2001
 "Wait", by The Kills from Keep on Your Mean Side, 2003
 "Wait", by Knuckle Puck from Shapeshifter, 2017
 "Wait", by NF from Mansion, 2015
 "Wait", by Royce da 5'9" from Layers, 2016
 "Wait", by Sarah McLachlan from Fumbling Towards Ecstasy, 1993
 "Wait", by Take That from Progress, 2010

Computing 
 Wait (command), computer shell command
 Wait (system call), operating system call

Education
 Wait Chapel, building on the campus of Wake Forest University in the U.S. state of North Carolina
 Western Australian Institute of Technology (WAIT), former name of Curtin University of Technology

Radio Stations
 WAIT (AM), a defunct radio station (850 AM) formerly licensed to serve Crystal Lake, Illinois, United States
 WCPT (AM), a radio station (820 AM) in Chicago, Illinois, which held the call sign WAIT from 1941 to 1986 and from 2005 to 2007
 WZSR, a radio station (105.5 FM) in Woodstock, Illinois, which held the call sign WAIT-FM from 1988 to 1991

Other uses 
 Wait (name)
 Wait, Kentucky, an unincorporated community in Wayne County
 Wait, the activity of a waiting staff in a restaurant

See also 
 The Wait (disambiguation)
 W8 (disambiguation)
 Waite (disambiguation)
 Waitt, a surname
 WAITS, a computer operating system
 Waiting (disambiguation)